Gurjit is a given name. Notable people with the given name include:

Gurjit Kaur (born 1995), Indian field hockey player
Gurjit Sandhu (born 1992), British cricketer
Gurjit Singh, Fijian football manager
Gurjit Singh, Indian diplomat